Trichogoniopsis is a genus of Brazilian plants in the tribe Eupatorieae within the family Asteraceae.

 Species
 Trichogoniopsis adenantha (DC.) R.M.King & H.Rob. - Brazil (Minas Gerais, São Paulo, Bahia, Mato Grosso, Ceará, Paraná, Rio de Janeiro, Espirito Santo)
 Trichogoniopsis grazielae Soar.Nunes - Brazil (Pernambuco)
 Trichogoniopsis morii R.M.King & H.Rob. - Brazil (Bahia)
 Trichogoniopsis podocarpa (DC.) R.M.King & H.Rob. - Brazil (Rio de Janeiro)

References

Asteraceae genera
Eupatorieae
Endemic flora of Brazil